Walthall is a village in Webster County, Mississippi. The population was 144 at the 2010 census. It is the county seat of Webster County, designated in 1876.

Geography
Walthall is located at  (33.606588, -89.279000).

Demographics

As of the census of 2000, there were 170 people, 61 households, and 50 families residing in the village. The population density was 173.0 people per square mile (67.0/km). There were 69 housing units at an average density of 70.2 per square mile (27.2/km). The racial makeup of the village was 92.94% White, 3.53% African American, 0.59% Asian, 0.59% from other races, and 2.35% from two or more races. Hispanic or Latino of any race were 1.18% of the population.

There were 61 households, out of which 41.0% had children under the age of 18 living with them, 68.9% were married couples living together, 6.6% had a female householder with no husband present, and 18.0% were non-families. 18.0% of all households were made up of individuals, and 9.8% had someone living alone who was 65 years of age or older. The average household size was 2.79 and the average family size was 3.18.

In the village, the population was spread out, with 31.8% under the age of 18, 10.6% from 18 to 24, 25.3% from 25 to 44, 21.2% from 45 to 64, and 11.2% who were 65 years of age or older. The median age was 30 years. For every 100 females, there were 107.3 males. For every 100 females age 18 and over, there were 93.3 males.

The median income for a household in the village was $31,000, and the median income for a family was $36,875. Males had a median income of $30,417 versus $23,750 for females. The per capita income for the village was $14,903. About 24.6% of families and 21.2% of the population were below the poverty line, including 22.4% of those under the age of eighteen and 57.9% of those 65 or over.

Education
The Village of Walthall is served by the Webster County School District.

References

Villages in Webster County, Mississippi
Villages in Mississippi
County seats in Mississippi